Ng Hui Lin (born 6 November 1989) is a Malaysian badminton player. She plays in the doubles event with her younger sister Ng Hui Ern. In December 2014, Hui Lin resigned from the Badminton Association of Malaysia to pursue her career.

Achievements

BWF World Junior Championships 
Girls' doubles

Mixed doubles

Asian Junior Championships 
Mixed doubles

BWF Grand Prix 
The BWF Grand Prix had two levels, the Grand Prix and Grand Prix Gold. It was a series of badminton tournaments sanctioned by the Badminton World Federation (BWF) and played between 2007 and 2017.

Women's doubles

Mixed doubles

  BWF Grand Prix Gold tournament
  BWF Grand Prix tournament

BWF International Challenge/Series 
Women's doubles

Mixed doubles

  BWF International Challenge tournament
  BWF International Series tournament

References

External links 
 

1989 births
Living people
Sportspeople from Kuala Lumpur
Malaysian sportspeople of Chinese descent
Malaysian female badminton players
Badminton players at the 2014 Asian Games
Asian Games competitors for Malaysia
Competitors at the 2007 Southeast Asian Games
Competitors at the 2009 Southeast Asian Games
Southeast Asian Games gold medalists for Malaysia
Southeast Asian Games bronze medalists for Malaysia
Southeast Asian Games medalists in badminton